Artuby (Artubi in Provençal) is a river in France, crossing the Alpes-de-Haute-Provence, Alpes-Maritimes and Var departments, and a sub-tributary of Rhône by the Verdon and Durance.

References

Rivers of France
Rivers of Provence-Alpes-Côte d'Azur
Rivers of Alpes-de-Haute-Provence
Rivers of Alpes-Maritimes
Rivers of Var (department)